Makhosonke Bhengu (born 21 November 1983 in Durban) is a South African footballer who last played for Pattaya United in the Thai Premier League.

References

External links

 Makhosonke Bhengu at HKFA
 Makhosonke Bhengu – PLAYER PROFILE – Orlando Pirates

1983 births
Living people
Sportspeople from Durban
Zulu people
South African soccer players
Orlando Pirates F.C. players
Fourway Athletics players
Tuen Mun SA players
Sun Hei SC players
AmaZulu F.C. players
Hong Kong First Division League players
Association football forwards
South African expatriate soccer players
Expatriate footballers in Hong Kong
South African expatriate sportspeople in Hong Kong
Expatriate footballers in Thailand